Hrabová may refer to places in the Czech Republic:

Hrabová (Šumperk District), a municipality and village in the Olomouc Region
Hrabová, a district of Ostrava

See also
Hrabová Roztoka, a municipality and village in the Prešov Region, Slovakia